Fort George Canyon Provincial Park is a provincial park south of Prince George in British Columbia, Canada. No camping, campfires, swimming, kayaking, horses, pets, or rock climbing are allowed. Skiing, fishing, and hunting are allowed.

See also
Steamboats of the Upper Fraser River in British Columbia
Fraser Canyon
Grand Canyon of the Fraser
Giscome Canyon

References
BCGNIS listing "Fort George Canyon Park (park)"
BCGNIS listing "Fort George Canyon (canyon)"

External links
Fort George Canyon Provincial Park at the British Columbia Ministry of Environment web site

Provincial parks of British Columbia
Canyons and gorges of British Columbia
Fraser River
Year of establishment missing